Greatest Hits is the first compilation album by American country music group Little Texas, released on September 26, 1995 via Warner Bros. Records. It is composed of nine tracks from their first three studio albums (1992's First Time for Everything, 1993's Big Time, and 1994's Kick a Little), as well as the newly recorded tracks "Life Goes On" and "Country Crazy"; released as singles in 1995, these songs reached #5 and #44, respectively, on the Hot Country Songs charts, with the former being their last Top 40 single of their career. Also included is the band's rendition of the Eagles hit "Peaceful Easy Feeling", which was previously included on 1993's Common Thread: The Songs of the Eagles.

Track listing

Charts

Weekly charts

Year-end charts

References

Little Texas (band) albums
1995 greatest hits albums
Warner Records compilation albums